HMS Oak was a modified Acheron-class destroyer of the Royal Navy. Launched in 1912, she saw extensive service during World War I as a tender to the flagship of the Grand Fleet, and for this purpose she was painted white, instead of the usual warship grey.  She was sold in 1921 to be scrapped.  Named after the Oak tree (genus Quercus), she was only the second ship of the Royal Navy to carry the name, and the first for over 250 years.

Pennant numbers

Construction
The "Firedrake Specials", "Special I class" or "Yarrow Specials" were a little larger than the rest of the class but carried the same armament. Firedrake, Lurcher and Oak were, however, distinctive in appearance and at least 4 knots faster than the rest of their class. Oak, the last of the class, was launched on 5 September 1912.

Wartime service
Oak was tender to the flagship of the Grand Fleet throughout the war, including the Battle of Jutland, and had the distinction of having the same commanding officer, Lieutenant Commander Douglas Faviell MVO, all her career.  Her hull was painted white to distinguish her, and in the course of her duties she often carried the most important visitors.  Of note, King George V travelled to Scapa Flow in 1915 for a two-day review of the Grand Fleet, crossing from Thurso.  Oak also carried Lord Kitchener from Scrabster to Scapa Flow on 5 June 1916 before transferring him to the cruiser Hampshire, which struck a mine shortly before 19:30 the same day, with the loss of all but 12 crew, including Field Marshal Kitchener.

Surrender of the German High Sea Fleet (1918)
Distinctive in her white paint, Oak carried the German Rear-Admiral Hugo Meurer from the cruiser Königsberg to surrender on 15 November 1918, to Admiral Sir David Beatty on board his flagship, in the Firth of Forth.

Under the terms of the Armistice, the German High Seas Fleet went into internment at the Royal Navy's base at Scapa Flow - in Operation ZZ, 60 Allied battleships escorted 11 battleships, 5 battlecruisers, 8 cruisers and 48 destroyers of the High Seas Fleet into captivity.  At 11:00 on 20 November 1918 King George V, Queen Mary and the Prince of Wales embarked in Oak and, preceded by the destroyer Verdun, steamed through the fleet, the Royal Standard at Oaks mainmast, cheered by every ship.

Disposal 
Oak was sold in May 1921  for breaking.

References

External links

 Battle of Jutland Crew Lists Project - HMS Oak Crew List

Acheron-class destroyers of the Royal Navy
Ships built on the River Clyde
1912 ships
World War I destroyers of the United Kingdom